Miko–de Gribaldy was a Belgian professional cycling team that existed from 1974 to 1976. The directeur sportif was former professional rider Jean de Gribaldy, who gave his name to the team. For the final year and a half of its history, its main sponsor was French ice cream manufacturer Miko, whose part-owner, Louis Ortiz, was a friend of de Gribaldy. Its most notable victory was the 1974 Liège–Bastogne–Liège with Georges Pintens.

References

Cycling teams based in Belgium
Defunct cycling teams based in Belgium
1974 establishments in Belgium
1976 disestablishments in Belgium
Cycling teams established in 1974
Cycling teams disestablished in 1976